Talismanic (foaled February 28, 2013) is a retired British-bred, French-trained Thoroughbred racehorse who achieved his greatest success in America in the 2017 Breeders' Cup Turf.

Background
Talismanic is a "photogenic" dark bay horse with a large white blaze and four white stockings. He was bred by Darley Stud, which purchased his sire Medaglia d'Oro in 2009. Medaglia d'Oro was the most successful performer on the dirt of El Prado, a son of Sadler's Wells, with major wins including the Travers Stakes, Whitney Handicap and Donn Handicap. As a sire, Medaglia d'Oro is best known for his American runners on the dirt, including champions Rachel Alexandra and Songbird, but has also had success with turf performers in Australia and Europe.
 
Talismanic's dam Magic Mission is a stakes-winning daughter of Machiavellian. She descends from the outstanding mare Highclere, winner of the 1000 Guineas and Prix de Diane. Other members of this family include Deep Impact, Nayef, Nashwan and Unfuwain.

Talismanic is owned by Godolphin, the racing arm of Darley Stud. He was trained by André Fabre and regularly ridden by Mickael Barzalona.

Racing career
Talismanic made his debut on 15 July 2015 at Deauville, finishing fifth in a maiden race over 1200 metres. He improved to finish second at Fontainebleau on 15 September, then broke his maiden with a seven-length victory at Compiègne over 2200 metres.

Talismanic made his first start as a three-year-old on 2 March 2016 at Saint-Cloud in the listed Prix Maurice Caittault, finishing second. He returned on 16 May to win the Prix de l'Avre at a distance of 2400 metres by  lengths. This encouraged Fabre to enter him in the Prix du Jockey-Club at Chantilly on 16 June, where he finished a creditable fourth to Almanzor. He next started in the Grand Prix de Paris on 14 July, in which he finished fifth but was beaten by only  lengths. He returned to the winner's enclosure in the listed Prix Turenne on 14 September before finishing a well-beaten eleventh in the Prix de l'Arc de Triomphe.

2017: four-year-old season
Talismanic began his four-year-old campaign on 17 March 2017 with a second-place finish in the listed Prix de la Porte de Madrid. He then went off as favourite in the Prix Lord Seymour on 17 April over a distance of 2400m. He set a slow early pace then accelerated about 300m from the finish line to win comfortably. In his next starts, he finished second in both the Prix d'Hédouville and Grand Prix de Chantilly.

On 17 July, Talismanic earned his first Group win in the Prix Maurice de Nieuil on firm going at Saint-Cloud, in which he set a course record for 2800m of 2m 58.40. He was held up well behind the early leaders then displayed an impressive turn of foot in the straight to win. Fabre then considered entering him in the Sword Dancer Stakes at Saratoga in America, but arrangements fell through. He instead finished a fast-finishing third on heavy going in the Prix Foy behind Dschingis Secret and Cloth of Stars.

Despite Talismanic's limited success at the highest level of racing, Fabre felt confident enough in the colt's ability to ship him to California for the Breeders' Cup Turf at Del Mar on 4 November. "I thought it would suit him because of his breeding, because of his balance, because of his mind and because of his ability", said Fabre. "He's a better horse than you've seen but difficult to place, which is why he went for longer-distance races."

Handicappers considered him to be a good longshot option in an excellent field that included defending champion Highland Reel and multiple graded/group one stakes winners such as Beach Patrol, Oscar Performance and Seventh Heaven. Talismanic raced a few lengths behind the early pace set by Oscar Performance, with Beach Patrol and Highland Reel tracking in second and third respectively. Around the final turn, Beach Patrol moved to the lead but Talismanic then started his drive and pulled away to win by half a length.

Joe Osborne of Godolphin credited Fabre for the win. "The man is a living legend", he said. "He's just a master trainer and trained this horse perfectly. So, it's just a great result for us by our stallion, and bred by us and everything. So it just ticks all the boxes."

Talismanic finished his four-year-old campaign on 10 December in the Hong Kong Vase at Sha Tin. He tracked a few lengths behind the early pace set by Helene Charisma followed by Highland Reel, who took command at the top of the straight. Talismanic then made a strong move to close to within a half length before Highland Reel responded and drew off to win by  lengths.

2018: five-year-old season

Talismanic made his first start of 2018 on 6 March over Chantilly's Fibresand all-weather surface in the Darshaan Stakes at a distance of 1,900m. He tracked the early pace until they entered the stretch, at which time Talismanic took control of the race. Cloth of Stars, the runner-up in the 2017 Prix de l'Arc de Triomphe, finished second. Fabre used the race as a prep for Talismanic's next scheduled start, the Dubai World Cup, in which Talismanic finished a disappointing ninth.

Fabre then gave Talismanic a "short holiday" before resuming training for the Prix Gontaut-Biron at Deauville on 15 August. On a good-to-soft turf course, he settled into fourth place during the early running, then took command with a furlong and a half remaining in the race. Eased near the wire, he still won by two lengths over Subway Dancer.

Talismanic was entered in the Prix Foy on 16 September, in which he tracked the early pace before taking the lead in the homestretch. He could not match the closing speed of Waldgeist and finished  lengths behind, just holding off Cloth of Stars for second. He then finished 13th behind Enable in the Prix de l'Arc de Triomphe on 7 October. Returning to the United States for the Breeders' Cup Turf on 3 November, he had a poor trip and finished sixth.

Retirement
On November 16, Godolphin announced that Talismanic had been retired. He entered stud in 2019 at Darley Japan for a fee of 1.8M Yen.

Pedigree

Talismanic is inbred 4S x 4D to Northern Dancer, meaning this stallion appears twice in the fourth generation of his pedigree.

References

External links
 Career 1-2-3 Colour Chart – Talismanic

2013 racehorse births
Racehorses bred in the United Kingdom
Racehorses trained in France
Breeders' Cup Turf winners
Thoroughbred family 2-f